The 2012–13 NBL season was the 35th season of competition since its establishment in 1979. A total of eight teams contested the league. The regular season was played between 5 October 2012 and 24 March 2013, followed by a post-season which involved the top four in April 2013. The schedule was announced on 4 June 2012. The New Zealand Breakers successfully defended their 2011–12 title for a third consecutive championship.

Broadcast rights were held by free-to-air network Channel Ten and its digital sports sister station One, in the third year of a five-year deal, through to the 2014–15 season. In New Zealand, Sky Sport were the official league broadcaster, with a three-year exclusive deal being signed.

Sponsorship included iiNet entering its third season as league naming rights sponsor and Spalding providing equipment including the official game ball.

The NBL All-Star Game was reintroduced to the fixture list after a four-year absence and was played on 22 December 2012 at the Adelaide Arena.

The league reverted to an eight-team competition when Gold Coast Blaze withdrew on 18 July 2012. A new schedule was released on 25 July 2012.

Pre-season

Perth Wildcats pre-season

2012 Cable Beach Invitational

Adelaide 36ers pre-season

2012 Longgang International Men’s Basketball Challenge 

Adelaide 36ers win 2012 Longgang International Men’s Basketball Challenge.

Melbourne Tigers pre-season

Wollongong Hawks pre-season

Cairns Taipans pre-season

Sydney Kings pre-season

New Zealand Breakers pre-season

Townsville Crocodiles pre-season

2012 NBL pre-season tournament

Finals 

Perth Wildcats are pre-season champions.

Regular season

Round 1

Round 2

Round 3

Round 4

Round 5

Round 6

Round 7

Round 8

Round 9

Round 10

Round 11

All-Star Game

Round 12

Round 13

Round 14

Round 15

Round 16

Round 17

Round 18

Round 19

Round 20

Round 21

Round 22

Round 23

Round 24

Ladder

The NBL tie-breaker system as outlined in the NBL Rules and Regulations states that in the case of an identical win–loss record, the results in games played between the teams will determine order of seeding.

1Head-to-Head between Sydney Kings and Melbourne Tigers (2-2). Sydney Kings won For and Against (+2).

Finals 

The 2012–13 National Basketball League Finals will be played in March and April 2013, consisting of two best-of-three semi-final and final series, where the higher seed hosts the first and third games.

Playoff Seedings 

 New Zealand Breakers
 Perth Wildcats
 Wollongong Hawks
 Sydney Kings

The NBL tie-breaker system as outlined in the NBL Rules and Regulations states that in the case of an identical win–loss record, the results in games played between the teams will determine order of seeding.

Under this system, Melbourne did not qualify for the playoffs by equalling Sydney's win–loss record, as the latter held advantage in the tiebreaker (2-2, +2 points).

Playoff bracket

Semi-finals

Grand Final

Season statistics

Statistics leaders

Note: regular season only (minimum 14 games)

Attendances

Note: regular season only

Top 10 Attendances

Awards

Player of the Week

Player of the Month

Coach of the Month

Season

The end-of-season awards ceremony was held in the Palladium Room at Crown Casino, Melbourne on Sunday, 24 March 2013.

 Most Valuable Player (Andrew Gaze Trophy): Cedric Jackson, New Zealand Breakers
 Rookie of the Year: Cameron Gliddon, Cairns Taipans
 Best Defensive Player: Damian Martin, Perth Wildcats
 Best Sixth Man: Adris Deleon, Wollongong Hawks
 Most Improved Player: Ben Madgen, Sydney Kings
 Coach of the Year (Lindsay Gaze Trophy): Andrej Lemanis, New Zealand Breakers
 Referee of the Year: Michael Aylen
 All-NBL First Team:
 Cedric Jackson - New Zealand Breakers
 Kevin Lisch - Perth Wildcats
 Ben Madgen - Sydney Kings
 Seth Scott - Melbourne Tigers
 Matthew Knight - Perth Wildcats
 All-NBL Second Team:
 Gary Ervin - Townsville Crocodiles
 Jonny Flynn - Melbourne Tigers
 Damian Martin - Perth Wildcats
 Mika Vukona - New Zealand Breakers
 Daniel Johnson - Adelaide 36ers
 All-NBL Third Team:
 Jamar Wilson - Cairns Taipans
 Adam Gibson - Adelaide 36ers
 Thomas Abercrombie - New Zealand Breakers
 Shawn Redhage - Perth Wildcats
 Ian Crosswhite - Sydney Kings

Finals
 Grand Final Series MVP (Larry Sengstock Medal): Cedric Jackson, New Zealand Breakers

See also
 2012–13 NBL squads
 2012–13 Adelaide 36ers season
 2012–13 New Zealand Breakers season
 2012 NBL All-Star Game

References

 
Australia,NBL
2012–13 in Australian basketball
2013 in New Zealand basketball
2012 in New Zealand basketball